Stalemate is an album by Nigerian Afrobeat composer, bandleader and multi-instrumentalist Fela Kuti recorded in 1977 and originally released on the Nigerian Decca label.

Reception

The Allmusic review awarded the album 3 stars, stating: "the subject matter is more social than political in content. In keeping with tradition, the album Stalemate consists of two extended pieces – one per side. The title track has a mid-tempo trance groove that bends and yields to Kuti's call and response with Africa '70".

Track listing
All compositions composed and arranged by Fela Kuti
 "Stalemate" – 12:54.
 "Don't Worry About My Mouth O (African Message)" – 15:45.

Personnel
Fela Kuti – tenor saxophone, alto saxophone, electric piano, vocals
Tunde Williams, Nwokoma Ukem – trumpet
Lester Bowie – trumpet
Lekan Animashaun – baritone saxophone
Leke Benson, Clifford Itoje, Oghene Kologbo – guitar
Nweke Atifoh – bass guitar
Tony Allen – drums
Ayoola Abayomi – percussion
Oladeinde Koffi, Addo Nettey, Shina Abiodun – congas
Babajide Olaleye – maracas 
Bimbo Adelanwa, Bola Olaniyi, Emaruagheru Osawe, Fehintola Kayode, Folake Oladeinde, Kewe Oghomienor, Ronke Edason, Shade Komolafe, Tejumade Adebiyi, Yemi Abegunde – chorus singers

References

Fela Kuti albums
1977 albums
Decca Records albums
Afrobeat albums